Mae Czarina Reyes Cruz-Alviar is a Filipino film and television director from the Philippines. She is known for the films Crazy Beautiful You (2015), Can't Help Falling in Love (2017), and Four Sisters Before the Wedding (2020).

Filmography

Film

Television

References

Year of birth missing (living people)
Living people